Solvated Metal Atom Dispersion is a method of producing highly reactive solvated nanoparticles. Samples of a metal (or ceramic) are heated to evaporate free atoms (or species), as in PVD evaporation. This vapor is then co-deposited with a suitable organic solvent (e.g. toluene) at very low temperatures (on the order of 70K) to form a solid mixture of the two. This is then warmed towards room temperature, producing solvated metal atoms or (over time) larger clusters. Sometimes, catalyst supports (such as SiO2 or Al2O3) are added to improve nucleation, as the process can more readily take place on surface OH groups.

References 

Chemical processes
Nanotechnology
Solutions